Pseudomonas oleovorans is a Gram-negative, methylotrophic bacterium that is a source of rubredoxin (part of the hydroxylation-epoxidation system). It was first isolated in water-oil emulsions used as lubricants and cooling agents for cutting metals. Based on 16S rRNA analysis, P. oleovorans has been placed in the P. aeruginosa group.

References

External links
Type strain of Pseudomonas oleovorans at BacDive -  the Bacterial Diversity Metadatabase

Pseudomonadales
Bacteria described in 1941